Lefteris Dimakopoulos is a Greek film released in 1993, directed by Periklis Hoursoglou. The film stars Nikos Georgakis, Maria Skoula and Nikos Orphanos. The film won four awards in Greek State Film Awards, as well the best film award in Greek Film Critics Association Awards.

Plot
The story takes place during the last years of the Junta. Lefteris, a young man with dreams aspires to become a successful and free man. So he leaves from his agricultural village to study in the Polytechnic University of Athens. In Athens, he lives with his girlfriend Dimitra, despite the opposition of his uncle who pay tuitions of his studies. Nevertheless, the next years, he feels that his relation with Dimitra becomes an obstacle to his ambitions. Finally he breaks up with his girlfriend. After many years he has become a successful engineer, but a visit of his best friend reminds him in the lost love with Dimitra. Then, he perceives that he hadn't won happiness.

Cast
Nikos Georgakis as Lefteris
Maria Skoula as Dimitra
Nikos Orphanos as Panayiotis

Awards

References

External links

Greek drama films
1993 films
Works about the Greek junta